Sainte-Croix (Languedocien: Senta Crotz) is a commune in the Tarn department in southern France.

In 2019, the commune had 386 inhabitants.

See also
Communes of the Tarn department

References

Communes of Tarn (department)